The Metropolitan areas of Italy are statistical areas denoting a region consisting of a densely populated urban core and its less-populated surrounding territories in the Italian republic. Since in Italy there is no unique definition of metropolitan area, below are given definition according to several sources.

Metropolitan areas according to alternative studies

Data by OECD (2010)

Data by Global MetroMonitor (2012) 

Urban Outlook 2015 by CityRailways

See also 
 Metropolitan cities of Italy
 List of cities in Italy

References